MOTD may refer to:

 Match of the Day, the BBC's main football television programme
 Match of the Day (U.S. TV series), NBCSN soccer television programme based on the above.
 Match of the Day (novel), novel by Chris Boucher based on the British science fiction television series Doctor Who.
 Message of the day, a message shown to computer users when they log in
 "Mothers of the Disappeared", a song by rock band U2

See also 

 Mothers of the Plaza de Mayo, sometimes called Mothers of the Disappeared